Kalateh Deh Now (also Romanized as Kalāteh Deh Now; also known as Deh Now) is a village in Jannatabad Rural District, Salehabad County, Razavi Khorasan Province, Iran. At the 2006 census, its population was 151, in 38 families.

References 

Populated places in   Torbat-e Jam County